David Scott Brown (born 29 September, 1966) is a Horace E. Raffensperger professor of history at Elizabethtown College, Pennsylvania, United States.
He is the author of several books, including biographies of Richard Hofstadter and F. Scott Fitzgerald.

Education and career 
Brown was born on 29 September, 1966 in Troy, Ohio. He graduated from Wright State University in 1990 and earned a master's degree from the University of Akron in 1992. He completed his Ph.D. in 1995 at the University of Toledo.

Brown joined Elizabethtown College in 1997, after previously teaching at the University of Toledo, Washtenaw Community College, and Saginaw Valley State University. He was named Raffensperger Professor in 2012.

Books 
In 2006, he published Richard Hofstadter: An Intellectual Biography. The book explores the life and times of Columbia University historian Richard Hofstadter.

His 2009 book Beyond the Frontier: The Midwestern Voice in American Historical Writing (also from the University of Chicago Press) is a study of Midwestern historians and their influence on the American historical profession.

He is also the author of Thomas Jefferson: A Biographical Companion (ABC-Clio, 1998); Moderates: The Vital Center of American Politics, from the Founding to Today (University of North Carolina Press, 2016); and Paradise Lost: A Life of F. Scott Fitzgerald (Harvard University Press, 2017).

References 

21st-century American historians
21st-century American male writers
Wright State University alumni
University of Akron alumni
University of Toledo alumni
University of Toledo faculty
Saginaw Valley State University faculty
Elizabethtown College faculty
Living people
1966 births
American male non-fiction writers